The Maritime Workers' Union of Nigeria (MWUN) is a trade union representing sailors, dockworkers and those in related trades in Nigeria.

History
The union was founded in 1996, when the Government of Nigeria merged four unions:

 Dockworkers' Union of Nigeria
 Nigerian Port Authority Workers' Union
 Nigeria Union of Seamen and Water Transport Workers
 Union of Shipping, Clearing and Forwarding Agencies Workers of Nigeria

Like all its predecessors, the union affiliated to the Nigeria Labour Congress, and by 2002, it had 83,479 members.

Presidents
1996: Uzojie Ukamuna
2001: Onikolease Irabor
2009: Anthony Nted Emmanuel  
2017: Prince Adewale Adeyanju

External links

References

Seafarers' trade unions
Trade unions established in 1996
Trade unions in Nigeria